The siege of Santuario de Nuestra Señora de la Cabeza took place from 14 September 1936 to 1 May 1937 in Andújar, Jaén, during the Spanish Civil War. The Republican army surrounded around 1,200 rebel civil guards and falangists who supported the Nationalists and forced them to surrender after a protracted offensive.

Background
After the failed coup of July 1936 in Andalusia, many groups of rebel civil guards retreated from their garrisons to hilltops, monasteries and others easily defensible points, living by robbing from the neighborhood. The longest surviving group of rebels was the encampment of the Nuestra Señora de la Cabeza's Sanctuary.

The siege
In August 1936, 250 civil guards from Jaén, most of their families, 100 falangists and about 1,000 members of the bourgeoisie of Andújar (Beevor: around 1,200 civil guards and falangists), retreated to the Nuestra Señora de la Cabeza's shrine, near Andújar. During the first months of the war, there had been no attack launched against this enclave, because the Republican committee of Andújar did not know that the civil guards of the shrine were rebels. After gathering a good supply of food, the civil guards decided to send a declaration of war to the committee in September 1936. Their commander, Major Nofuentes, who wanted to surrender, was deposed by captain Santiago Cortés and the Republicans started the siege. Nationalist aircraft from Córdoba and Seville dropped supplies into the encampment (160,000 pounds of food from Seville and 140,000 pounds from Córdoba). Medical supplies and delicate goods were attached to live turkeys. Furthermore, pigeons sent news and messages to the Nationalists in Seville.

In December 1936, Queipo de Llano launched an offensive in order to occupy Andújar and relieve the shrine, but the offensive was stopped at Lopera in January 1937 (20 milles away from Andújar). In April 1937, the Republican government decided to crush the resistance of the rebels and sent a large force (20,000 men), led by communist major Martínez Cartón. The Republican forces split the rebel enclave in two and conquered the encampment of Lugar Nuevo. Franco then gave permission to Cortés to evacuate women and children and to surrender should resistance become impossible, but Cortés rejected the evacuation of the women and children. On April 30, Cortés was wounded and on May 1, the Republicans broke into the sanctuary.

Aftermath
The remaining rebels were taken prisoner and Cortés died of wounds in hospital. The rebels received little recognition in Nationalist Spain.

See also 

 List of Spanish Republican military equipment of the Spanish Civil War
 List of Spanish Nationalist military equipment of the Spanish Civil War

Footnotes

References
Beevor, Antony. (2006). The Battle for Spain. The Spanish Civil War, 1936-1939. Penguin Books. London.
Thomas, Hugh. (2001). The Spanish Civil War. Penguin Books. London.
Antonio Marín Muñoz. (2004). I besiege to the Sanctuary of the Virgin of the Head, of Andújar (1936-1937). Madrid.

External links
Website dedicated to the siege

Battles of the Spanish Civil War
Santuario de Nuestra Señora de la Cabeza
1936 in Spain
1937 in Spain
Conflicts in 1936
Conflicts in 1937
Santuario de Nuestra Señora de la Cabeza
Province of Jaén (Spain)